Tambakbaya is a village in the Banten province on the island of Java, Indonesia.

Location

Tambakbaya is in the district of Cibadak in the Lebak Regency in Banten. 
As of 2010 the village had a population of 5,469.

Historical

In 1813 Java was under British control and the land was being leased rather than subject to forced deliveries and contingents as it had been under the Dutch.
Major Udney Yule, the British resident, was instructed by Stamford Raffles to grant equitable and moderate leases to the renter class.
All the half-yearly rents in the Bantam Residency due on 1 July 1813 were paid on time apart from those due from Pontang, Tanara, Tambakbaya and Trate(?). 
In this area a drought had caused the rice crop to fail entirely.

Notes

Sources

Districts of Banten